SSDF can refer to:
Swedish Chess Computer Association
Somali Salvation Democratic Front
South Sudan Defense Forces, a rival group to the Sudan People's Liberation Army